Liberton RFC is a rugby union club based in Edinburgh, Scotland.

History

The club was formed in 1963 by former pupils of Liberton High School in Edinburgh.

In 2016, the club formed a women's side. In 2023, the club controversially disbanded the women's team, stating it could not manage their 'additional needs'. This came against the backdrop of accusations of homophobia, misogyny and racism by members of the club committee towards female players and members of the club.

Sides

The club runs a men's and women's side. Both train on Tuesday and Thursday nights from 7pm to 8.30pm. Matches are played on a Saturday.

During coronavirus restrictions training will be limited to Tuesdays only.

Honours

Men's

 Edinburgh and District league
 Champions (1): 1974-75
 Edinburgh Northern Sevens
 Champions (6): 1968, 1969, 1971, 1972, 1973, 1975
 I.C.I. Sevens
 Champions (1): 1971
 East Region Bowl 
 Winners (1) 2013

Notable former players

Men

Scotland

The following former Liberton RFC players have represented Scotland.

References

Rugby union in Edinburgh
Scottish rugby union teams